Fun Bar Karaoke ( or Fan ba karaoke, literally "dream crazy karaoke") is a 1997 crime-comedy directed by Pen-Ek Ratanaruang. The film had its world premiere at the 1997 Berlin Film Festival for which Pen-Ek was credited as "Tom Pannet". It screened in the festival's Forum section.

Plot

Pu is a young woman who is having some bad dreams. Her father, meanwhile, has fallen in love with a karaoke bar hostess girl named Yok who's the girlfriend of a mobster. A hitman named Noi is then dispatched to kill the father, and Pu ends up falling in love with Noi.

Cast
 Fay Atsawet as Pu
 Ray MacDonald as Noi
 Champagne X as Yok
 Phaibunkiat Khiaogao as Pu's Father

References
 Morris, Ron. 2000. "Bangkok Dispatch", Future Frame (retrieved October 17, 2006).

External links
 
 
 Five Star Production synopsis
 Review at View from the Brooklyn Bridge

1997 films
Five Star Production films
Thai crime comedy films
Thai-language films
1990s crime comedy films
Films directed by Pen-Ek Ratanaruang
Thai national heritage films
1997 directorial debut films
1997 comedy films